The Tower is a 2012 German TV drama film based on the eponymous 2008 novel by Uwe Tellkamp. It is about life and history in Dresden between 1982 and 1989 in the German Democratic Republic, GDR and its last years before demonstrations, the time of Die Wende (the turning from former socialistic government with Stasi-elements to democracy), the tearing down  of the wall and before German reunification.

Cast 
 Hans-Uwe Bauer as Ulrich Rohde 
 Klaus Bieligk as Heinz Schiffner
 Martin Bruchmann as Jens Ansorge
  as Der Ältere (Stasi)
  as Reina Kossmann
  as Frau Kolb 
 Andreas Genschmar as Lagerarbeiter
 Bettina Kenney as Student 
  as Falk Truschler
 Steffi Kühnert as Barbara Rohde
 Ramona Kunze-Libnow as Oberschwester
 Jan Josef Liefers as Richard Hoffmann
Juergen Maurer as Lawyer Sperber
  as Manfred Weniger
 Claudia Michelsen as Anne Hoffmann
 Sergej Moya as Ezzo Rohde
 Annika Olbrich as Franziska
 Peter Prager as Direktor Fahner
 Bruno Renne as Phillip
 Lea Ruckpaul as Verena
 Udo Schenk as Kohler
 Götz Schubert as Meno Rohde
 Ernst-Georg Schwill as Chefarzt Müller
 Martin Seifert as Herr Schnürchel
 Christian Sengewald as Thomas Wernstein
 Peter Sodann as Max Barsano
 Stephanie Stumph as Ina Rohde
 Valery Tscheplanowa as Judith Schevola
 Nadja Uhl as Josta Fischer
 Sebastian Urzendowsky as Christian Hoffmann
 Antonio Wannek as Stefan Kretzschmar
 Carina Wiese as Regine

References

External links 

2012 television films
2012 films
German television films
2012 drama films
German drama films
2010s German-language films
German-language television shows
Television shows based on German novels
Das Erste original programming
Grimme-Preis for fiction winners
Films directed by Christian Schwochow
2010s German films